The 2008 International Rules Series was the 14th annual International Rules Series and was played between Ireland and Australia.

After the 2007 series was cancelled by the Gaelic Athletic Association, the Australian Football League and the GAA agreed in 2008 to resume the series.

The matches were played in Australia – 24 October in Perth, Western Australia and 31 October in Melbourne (after the AFL Grand Final and All-Ireland Senior Football Championship).

Ireland won by five points on aggregate after recording victories in both tests.

Rule changes 
 Maximum of 14 interchanges per quarter.
 Teams are allowed only four consecutive hand passes (ball must then be kicked).
 Match time reduced from 20 to 18 minutes per quarter (with stoppage time for breaks in play).
 Goalkeeper can no longer kick the ball to himself from the kick-out.
 Suspensions may carry over the GAA and AFL matches if The Match Review Panel see fit.
 A dangerous "slinging" tackle will be an automatic red card.
 A shirtfront endangering the head will result in a red card.
 Physical intimidation can result in a yellow card.
 One-handed tackles result in a free kick.
 An independent referee can cite players for reportable offenses from the stands.
 Yellow cards sin bin reduced to 10 minutes.

Squads 

Notes:
 Main sources for squads: BBC Sport Online and Hogan Stand.
 Kerry's Tommy Walsh was named on the original Irish squad, but had to withdraw due to club commitments with Kerins O'Rahilly's. He was replaced by Paul Finlay.
 Dublin's Bernard Brogan was named on the Irish original squad, but had to withdraw due to club commitments with St Oliver Plunketts/Eoghan Ruadh. He was replaced by Martin McGrath.
 The match-day squad for both teams was limited to 24 players each. Thus Australia (who had a 25 man squad) had to drop one player for each test and Ireland (who had a 27 man squad) had to drop three players.

Ireland manager Boylan was criticised for including David Gallagher in his squad, as he was not then playing inter-county football.

Irish management team 
 Coach – Seán Boylan
 Selectors:
 Anthony Tohill
 Hugh Kenny
 Eoin Liston
 Runner – Seán Marty Lockhart
 Backroom team:
 Trevor Brennan (fitness & tackling)
 Mike McGurn (fitness & tackling)
 Tour Manager – Seán Walsh
 Assistant Tour Manager – Tommy Kilcoyne
 Team doctor – Dr. Owen Clarke
 Physiotherapist – Frank Foley
 Masseur – Martin Regan
 Kit manager – Owen Lynch
 Waterboys – Ciaran Boylan and Pauric Gallagher
Notes:
 Main sources: Hogan Stand

Refereeing team 
 Main referees – Pat McEnaney (Ireland) and Stephen McBurney (Australia)
 Standby referees / linesmen – David Coldrick (Ireland) and Brett Rosebury (Australia)
 Umpires – Gearóid Ó Conámha & John Bannon (Ireland) and Steven Axon & Peter Nastasi (Australia)
 Video match referee – Ian Curlewis (South Africa)

Notes:
 Main source: Hogan Stand

Matches

First test

Second test

References

External links 
 

International Rules series
International Rules Series
International Rules series
International sports competitions hosted by Australia